The Taizhou Sports Centre Stadium (Simplified Chinese: 台州体育中心) is a multi-use stadium in Taizhou, China.  It is currently used mostly for football matches.  The stadium holds 40,000 people and opened in 2003.

External links
Venue information

Footnotes

Football venues in China
Sports venues in Zhejiang